is a railway station on the JR West San'yō Main Line (JR Kobe Line) in Suma-ku, Kobe, Hyōgo Prefecture, Japan. Only local trains stop at Takatori Station. The station has a somewhat unusual layout. However, the express tracks are separated from the station platform by a series of tracks and an active freight-related loading area. As a result, the express tracks are located roughly 60 meters north of the island platform and are usually not in full view from the platform.

Takatori Catholic Church designed by Shigeru Ban, internationally known Japanese architect, is a fifteen-minute walk from Takatori Station.

In 2016, Japanese geologists at the Riken Advanced Institute for Computational Science used the seismic waves recorded at Takatori station during the Great Hanshin earthquake of 1995 to analyze the seismic response of a reinforced concrete pier.

Adjacent stations

|-
!colspan=5|West Japan Railway Company (JR West)

History 
Station numbering was introduced in March 2018 with Takatori being assigned station number JR-A66.

References

External links

JR West - Takatori Station

JR Kobe Line
Sanyō Main Line
Railway stations in Kobe
Railway stations in Japan opened in 1900